The Wallenberg family is a prominent Swedish family, Europe's most powerful business dynasty. Wallenbergs are noted as bankers, industrialists, politicians, bureaucrats, diplomats, and military officials. The Wallenberg sphere's holdings employ about 1 million people, and have sales of $154 billion a year. The Wallenberg empire consists of 16 Wallenberg Foundations, Foundation Asset Management AB (FAM), Investor AB, Patricia Industries, and Wallenberg Investments AB.

In the 1970s, the Wallenberg family businesses employed 40% of Sweden's industrial workforce and represented 40% of the total worth of the Stockholm Stock Exchange. By 2011, their conglomerate holding company, Investor AB, had ownership of approximately 120 companies. By 2022, this number was 330. In 2015, the family still owned a third of Sweden's entire stock exchange, and their net worth was estimated at €250 billion according to the Financial Times (or $278 billion according to CNBC).

The companies in the Wallenberg sphere include Swedish multinationals and other European industrial groups, such as world-leading telecommunication multinational Ericsson; Scandinavian and Baltic bank giant Skandinaviska Enskilda Banken; one of the world's largest paper and pulp multinationals Stora Enso (the world's oldest limited liability company); Nasdaq, Inc.; global leader in smart technologies and complete lifecycle solutions for marine and energy markets Wärtsilä; the world's second-largest appliance maker Electrolux; one of the world's largest power, automation and robotics multinationals ABB; one of Europe's largest aerospace and arms manufacturers SAAB; Scandinavian airliner SAS Group; the world's largest ball-bearing company SKF; manufacturer of compressors, vacuum and air treatment systems, construction equipment, power tools and assembly systems Atlas Copco; Europe's fourth largest pharmaceutical multinational AstraZeneca; outdoor power products, consumer watering products, cutting equipment and diamond tools manufacturer Husqvarna; Sobi; mining and infrastructure business company Epiroc; investment conglomerate Investor AB; the Grand Group hotel; world's largest supplier of powdered metal Höganäs AB; Europe's second-largest equity firm with portfolio companies in Europe, Asia and the USA EQT Partners, etc. Former holdings include, among others, fifth-largest truck manufacturer in the world Scania AB, Saab Automobile, and Alfa Laval.

Wallenbergs, through the Knut and Alice Wallenberg Foundation, allocate annually SEK 2 billion to science and research, which makes the Knut and Alice Wallenberg Foundation one of the largest private research foundations in Europe, and has, until 2020, awarded SEK 31.2 billion in grants.

Raoul Wallenberg, a diplomat, worked in Budapest, Hungary, during World War II to rescue Jews from the Holocaust. Between July and December 1944, he issued protective passports and housed Jews, saving tens of thousands.

Early History 

The earliest known member patrilineally of the Wallenberg family is maintaining farmer Per Hansson (1670–1741) of Herseberga farm in the parish of Skärskind outside Linköping in Östergötland, who, in 1692, married Kerstin Jacobsdotter Schuut (1671–1752). The couple had three sons; one of the sons, Anders, a vicar, adopted the name Hertzman, and became the progenitor of the Hertzman family, whereas their other two sons, the county sheriffs Jacob and Hans, adopted the name Wallberg. Jacob Wallberg married twice, first Märta Christina Kiuhlman, daughter of inspector Erik Kiuhlman, and then Anna Kristina Tillberg, daughter of vicar Marcus Joannis Tillberg. The children of the second marriage adopted the surname Wallenberg. The eldest son was the lector of theology and vicar of Slaka parish, Marcus Wallenberg. His younger brother, Jacob Wallenberg, was a naval chaplain of the Swedish East India Company, and author of the Swedish classic, a travelogue  My Son on the Galley, original title .

The eldest son of lector and vicar Marcus Wallenberg, and the only child in his marriage to Sara Helena Kinnander, was Marcus Wallenberg (1774–1833). Marcus Wallenberg studied at Uppsala University in the early 1790s and was promoted Master of Philosophy in 1797 and in the same year graduated juris utriusque. He became an associate professor of Roman eloquence in 1800, but was forced to leave Uppsala the same year after the so-called music process and moved to Lund where he married Anna Laurentia Barfoth, daughter of professor of anatomy at Lund university, Andreas Barfoth, and Elsa Maria Bager, of the famous merchant family Bager of Malmö. In 1802, he became a notarius publicus in Linköping, and in 1805, an associate professor of Greek at Linköping University where he translated the Illiad and Odyssey from Greek to Swedish. He was ordained in 1817, promoted doctor of theology around the time of Karl XIV Johan's ascension to the throne, and between 1819 and 1833, held the position as bishop of Linköping diocese. He attended the Riksdags in 1823 and between 1828 and 1830. In 1801, Wallenberg was elected a member of the Swedish Royal Academy of Music and in 1821, he became an honorary member of the Royal Swedish Academy of Letters, History and Antiquities.

Marcus Wallenberg was also engaged in freemasonry and a member of the masonic lodges in Malmö and Lund in the province of Scania. He was also one of the initiators behind one of the masonic lodges in Linköping and later became its Grand Master.

André Oscar Wallenberg, the founder of the banking dynasty 

André Oscar Wallenberg was born on the 19th of November, 1816, in Linköping where his father held the position as bishop in Linköping Cathedral. Between 1825 and 1832, he attended Linköping trivial school and high school, and in 1832, traveled as a young man to the Caribbean and became a sea cadet on his return. After graduating as a naval officer in Karlskrona in 1835, he served for a few years as a sailor on North American trunk ships, and in 1837, he became an officer in the Swedish navy and served as commander of Sweden's first propeller ship Linköping. Four years later, he accompanied the Oxehufvudian expedition to South America. However, due to the fact that the expedition was poorly led, he left it in Lisbon. He then spent a year in Spain and France studying languages and law at Grenoble University, and spent a long time in Brest studying their shipyards and workshops.
In 1850, Wallenberg was commanded to Sundsvall as first lieutenant and head of a boatman company. He swore the Burgess Oath in Sundsvall and became a Burgess of the said city. He resigned from the military service in 1851 as first lieutenant. He became friends with the sawmill owner and industrialist Fredrik Bünsow and mediated loans to him at the acquisition of Skönvik in 1856, which became Skönvik Sawmill AB, and later a cornerstone of SCA (company). In 1858, Wallenberg and Bünsow also founded the city's first brewery, Sundsvall Brewery. Wallenberg also represented the city as a Member of Parliament.

As a banker, he was a pioneer in Europe. Already during his stay in the United States in 1837, at the time of the Panic of 1837, he wanted to become a banker. He had learned how banks should not be run. He participated in the establishment of the Filialbanken in Sundsvall and Hudiksvall and became its first manager. In 1856, he founded Stockholms Enskilda Bank at Lilla Nygatan 23 in the Old Quarters of Stockholm, which was modelled after the Scottish banking system, and was until his death its president. He introduced the postal exchange, which simplified the possibilities of transferring money between different locations, ―still almost unknown outside Sweden―, a comparatively high deposit rate, which led to an increase in the deposit, depreciation and amortisation business ― the bank's capital was made up of deposits from the public and not, as with previous banks, through private banknote issuance. The business idea was that, if the savers left the money tied up in an account for a longer period of time, they would receive a higher interest rate. In 1861, he founded Stockholms Hypotekskassa, Stockholm's mortgage bank. In 1863, he participated in founding Skandinaviska kreditaktiebolaget with Oscar Ekman, Oscar Dickson, Olof Wijk the Younger and the Dane Carl Frederik Tietgen (which later would become Skandinaviska Banken in 1937 and finally merged with Wallenbergs' Stockholms Enskilda Bank in 1972), and in 1867, he was Sweden's representative at the International Monetary Conference in Paris, at which conference he was introduced to Napoleon III and befriended people in the political and financial circles of France, and afterwards maintained close relations with them, among others, Félix Esquirou de Parieu, Eugène Rouher, Lionel de Moustier, Michel Chevalier, Léon Say, Pierre Paul Leroy-Beaulieu.

Internationally, he was well-connected and established a network with bankers in foreign countries which proved faithful later in life when the public opinion of him in Sweden was very negative. He often visited his foreign friends during his travels to France, Germany and United Kingdom; in Paris, he met with the banking firms Mallet Frères et Cie and Crédit Lyonnais, in London, with the German-Danish-British banking firms Frederick Huth & Co, C. J. Hambro &. Son and Frühling & Göschen, and in Hamburg, with Joh. Berenberg, Gossler & Co.

He was also a member of several national committees, including the committee regarding proposals for laws of prospecting, the committee on constitutions concerning weights and measures (which introduced the meter system), the banking committee, the committee on laws concerning companies, and a chairman of Stockholm's trade and shipping board. In addition to the modernisation of banking legislation, Wallenberg contributed to the increased rights for women, among other things, by being the first in Europe to allow women to work in banks (see Alida Rossander), and allow women to open their own bank accounts.

A.O., which he is called in the family, also became involved in many industries, including  Atlas Diesel (which later would become Atlas Copco), Hofors AB, several railway companies such as Gefle-Dala järnväg, Bergslagernas järnväg, shipping companies, breweries such as Münchenbryggeriet. He was a co-owner of Bore newspaper, and provided both pecuniary support and articles for Stockholmsposten. He wrote articles on economic issues on a weekly basis for Aftonbladet.

He died in January 1886 in Stockholm and was buried in the Wallenberg Mausoleum at Malmvik. He was married twice; first to Wilhelmina Catharina Andersson, and in his second to Miss Anna Eleonora Charlotte von Sydow, born 1835, died 1910 in Stockholm, daughter of Rear Admiral Johan Gustaf von Sydow and his second wife Eleonora Juliana Wiggman. He had a total of twenty children with three different women.

Late 19th and early 20th century — 2nd generation Wallenbergs

Knut Agathon Wallenberg 

Knut Agathon Wallenberg, like his father André Oscar Wallenberg, was trained as a naval officer, at Naval School of Warfare. In 1876, he attended Georgiis' Banking Institution, and then gained an early banking internship in Paris at Credit Lyonnais. Upon his father's death in 1886, Knut Agathon became President of Stockholms Enskilda Bank. This took place at the same time as an intensive investment period in Swedish business began. During this time, Stockholms Enskilda Bank played an innovative role by connecting the French capital market with the demand for credit in the rapidly expanding Swedish industry. The bank played an important role in financing Sweden's breakthrough as an industrial nation. Knut Agathon Wallenberg created a very large fortune and a leading position in Swedish society. He was involved in everything from reconstructions in the mining industry and engineering companies to the exploitation of the ore fields in Norrbotten.

Wallenberg was intensely involved in various societal issues, not least in Stockholm's development. For more than 30 years, he was active in municipal politics in the capital, as a member of the Stockholm City Council 1883–1914. He was also a Member of the Riksdag in the First Chamber for more than a decade, 1907–1919, and Minister of Foreign Affairs during the war years 1914–1917. In his position as Foreign Minister, he was seen, especially by the left, as a counterweight to the German-oriented forces in government. He was the initiator, lender, donor and driving force behind a large number of contemporary construction projects, mainly in Stockholm, including the Royal Swedish Opera, Stockholm School of Economics, Stockholm City Hall, Stockholm City Library, Swedish Maritime History Museum and the Swedish Institute in Rome. He was also the initiator and driving force behind the development of the community Saltsjöbaden, its residential town, railway, Grand Hotel Saltsjöbaden, the Church of Revelation where he and his wife Alice are buried in a sarcophagus, and the Observatory.

In 1903, following a proposal from businessmen in the Swedish business community, Knut Agathon Wallenberg donated a large sum to the founding of a business school in Stockholm. The money was used by the School of Business, Economics and Law, which was established in 1906 to found the Stockholm School of Economics in 1909, which is still financed and controlled by the Wallenbergs today and has, since then, sister schools in Riga, Latvia, and St.Petersburg, Russia. Wallenberg was chairman of the Swedish School of Economics 'Association, the Swedish School of Economics' highest decision-making body, 1906–1938. He was also vice chairman of the board of the Stockholm School of Economics, the university's highest executive body, 1909–1938. He donated funds for the establishment of André Oscar Wallenberg's professorship in economics and banking at the university in 1917. He also made large donations to finance the university's new main building at Sveavägen 65 in Stockholm.

British Bank of Northern Commerce was founded in February 1912 by  Knut Agathon Wallenberg and Emil Glückstadt of Landmandsbanken together with several other banks including Centralbanken of Norway in Oslo, Banque de Commerce de l'Azoff-Don in St.Petersburg, and Banque de Paris et des Pays Bas in Paris. The purpose of the bank was to facilitate trade between the United Kingdom and northern Europe. The bank financed Finland after the country achieved its independence from Russia in 1917–18. In June 1919 the bank offered the chairmanship of its board to John Maynard Keynes with the assurance that in return for a salary of £2000 the job would only take a morning a week. Keynes had met Knut Agathon Wallenberg and Glückstadt during World War I and believed the offer was attractive. However, Keynes consulted with several bankers in the city and turned the offer. In October 1920 British Bank of Northern Commerce merged with C.J. Hambro & Sons, rebranded Hambros Bank of Northern Commerce. In August 1921 the bank shortened its name to Hambros Bank.

In 1938, Knut Agathon Wallenberg died. Knut and his wife Alice had no issue, apart from an adopted daughter, Jeanne, born out of wedlock to Jean Karadja Pasha, and thus half-sister to Constantin Karadja, and therefore chose to bequeath his enormous fortune to the already formed Knut and Alice Wallenberg Foundation.

Marcus Wallenberg Sr. 

Knut Agathon Wallenberg's younger brother Marcus Wallenberg Sr. carried on the tradition and took over as the bank's CEO in 1911, replacing his older brother who was appointed Stockholms Enskilda Bank chairman of the board.

Marcus Wallenberg Sr., commonly called häradshövdingen, the circuit judge, due to his law degree, was the great initiative force in the family's industrial commitments; founding, reorganising and reconstructing companies, banks and institutes. He founded Centralbanken of Norway, AB Emissionsinstitutet, Papyrus AB, Swedish Diesel Company, Swedish-Russian-Danish Telephone Aktiebolaget, Mexican Telephone AB Ericsson, reorganising of Nordiska trävaru AB, Kopparbergs & Hofors AB, and of Wifstavarfs AB. He founded, together with Sam Eyde and Kristian Birkeland, Norsk Hydro, and saved ASEA (ABB) from bankruptcy, and not the least founded the Federation of Swedish Industries. He was the main representative in Sweden of the modern pursuit of industry concentration under the leadership of the major banks.

In addition to this, he had an active career on the world stage as an active member on many international committees. During World War I, he was repeatedly called upon to bring about trade agreements with England and its allies vis-à-vis the Russian Revolution, the Sykes-Picot agreement and the Balfour Declaration. In the winter of 1919, Wallenberg had to monitor Sweden's interests in financial matters on behalf of the Swedish government during the Paris Peace Conference and in 1920 was Sweden's representative at the Brussels Finance Conference. In 1920, he became a member of the League of Nations' newly established Financial Committee, of which he was chairman. In 1921, Wallenberg founded the Swedish Taxpayers' Association. Wallenberg participated in leading positions in the implementation of the Dawes Plan. He was Chairman of the Committee on the German Industry's encumberment, a Chairman of the Committee for the Arrangement of Germany's Natural Supplies, the arbitrator in disputes between the German government and the Repair Committee, which was responsible for the Allies' establishment of a functional infrastructure between 1925 and 1930. He was responsible for the interpretation of the Young Plan in 1930. Between 1931 and 1934, Marcus Wallenberg Sr. was the Chairman of the Arbitration Court, which dealt with short-term German credits in the establishment of the German moratorium, established in 1932 in Lausanne. In 1931, Marcus Wallenberg Sr., along with Hjalmar Schacht, was also appointed as an expert by the German government to reconstruct the German banking system in order to adapt it to the Bank of International Settlements.

Marcus Wallenberg Sr. sat on the Credits Arbitration Committee with Thomas H. McKittrick and Franz Urbig, which solved disputes between German commercial banks. Marcus Wallenberg Sr. taught McKittrick about the complicated international finances, and was an important mentor to the American throughout his presidency of the Bank for International Settlements, teaching him to play both sides simultaneously in the war, which would guarantee the banks and business empires future existence regardless of the outcome. McKittrick wrote to Marcus Wallenberg Sr. in 1943,

 

Marcus Wallenberg Sr. has been described as an eager beaver, unprententious and frugal (money would be spent on projects and not consumption), cautious regarding business, whose main focus was on work.

According to the former SVT journalist and authority on Ivar Kreuger, Nikola Majstrovic, in his book, the Truth Behind the Kreuger Crash, Marcus Wallenberg Sr. and the banker J. P. Morgan Jr. paid Josef Stalin to orchestrate the assassination of Ivar Kreuger.

Gustaf Oscar Wallenberg 

Marcus's brother Gustaf Oscar Wallenberg, grandfather of Raoul Wallenberg, became a lieutenant in 1882 and a captain in the Swedish navy in 1892. He left the active military service in 1891 to devote himself to business. He was particularly concerned with traffic issues and the improvement of Sweden's shipping connections. He was the managing director of the shipping company, which, in 1897, managed the ferry traffic between Trelleborg in Sweden and Sassnitz in Germany, and was active on the trade and shipping committee to increase the shipping industry, and, in particular, worked to establish direct Swedish relations with more important transoceanic countries. In 1892, he became the first managing director of Järnvägs AB Stockholm – Saltsjön, but left this post in 1896. Between 1900 and 1907, he belonged to the Swedish parliament's second chamber as a representative of the city of Stockholm. At first, he described himself as independent, but from 1902 he belonged to the Liberal Coalition Party.

After the dissolution of the Union between Sweden and Norway, there was a question of reorganising Sweden's diplomacy, Wallenberg was used for this tasks, and in 1906 was appointed envoy to Tokyo, and in 1907, accredited in Beijing. Wallenberg thus became the first permanently stationed Swedish career diplomat in East Asia.
At the same time, he was promoted to commander of the 1st degree. In 1908, Wallenberg concluded a Treaty of Friendship, Trade and Shipping with the Chinese Qing Court. The Treaty reaffirmed the extensive privileges Sweden had secured with the Treaty of Canton, which went beyond that of other European nations. Wallenberg's return from Tokyo attracted considerable attention in early 1918. Due to the precarious conditions caused by the war and especially the Russian Revolution, Wallenberg was stopped in Siberia, where he was detained for a long time, and then had to return to Japan, only to travel across the United States. He first arrived in Sweden in February 1919. In 1920, Wallenberg was transferred to Istanbul, Turkey, as Minister. He was accredited in Sofia, Bulgaria, and held the position until 1930.

He became well known for his stern refusal to let his daughter Nita Wallenberg marry the artist Nils von Dardel to whom she became secretly engaged in 1917 Dardel was told by her family that he "dithed not meet the requirements to be married into the Wallenberg family". The risk that Dardel would take advantage of being married into the family was considered very high. Nita Wallenberg was forced to burn all of Dardel's letters and forget her romance.

Mid 20th century — 3rd generation Wallenbergs

Epoch of Jacob Wallenberg 

  
Jacob Wallenberg (1892–1980), eldest son of Marcus Wallenberg Sr., became the CEO of Skandinaviska Enskilda Banken in 1927, joined by his younger brother Marcus Wallenberg Jr. as the deputy CEO.

World War II 

During World War II, the Wallenbergs' Stockholms Enskilda Bank collaborated with the German government and other German corporations, including Bosch and IG Farben, by acting as a purchasing agent, and assisted Nazi-Germany in a variety of ways through Wallenberg multinationals. Jacob Wallenberg dealt with the Germans in Berlin, while Marcus dealt with the British and Americans in London and New York, in which cities he was friends with the banking elite. Jacob was awarded the Grand Cross of the Order of the German Eagle in Berlin in 1941.

Ball-Bearing from Wallenbergs SKF 
The Wallenberg-owned ball-bearing multinational, SKF, supplied the German military with ball-bearing and ball-bearing machines, and had a monopoly on it in Europe. SKF also supplied the allies with ball-bearing. SKF's ball-bearings were Sweden's most important strategic contribution to German war production. In the spring of 1944, the Swedish government along with the Wallenbergs, promised the Allies that the export of ball-bearings would cease. However, SKF continued to export. When this could not be done legally, the ball-bearings were smuggled to Germany. As late as 1945, SKF sold ball-bearing steel and ball-bearing machines to Hitler. It has been estimated that the supply of ball-bearing prolonged the World War II by two years. SKF actively worked to cut off the supply of ball-bearings to the defense industry in the US and instead supplied products from its American factories to Nazi Germany through subsidiaries in South America.

Heavy Water and Aluminium from Norsk Hydro & Stockholms Superfosfat Fabriks AB-Ljungaverk 

In addition to ball-bearing, the Wallenbergs' assisted by supplying the Germans with heavy water, aluminium and chemicals for explosives from Wallenbergs Norsk Hydro, which had been founded by the Wallenbergs. At the plants in Rjukan in Norway, Norsk Hydro, together with the Swiss firm Escher-Wyss, cooperated on the Nazi-Germany's nuclear weapons program. Marcus Wallenberg Sr. was chairman of the board of Norsk Hydro as late as 1941. Wallenbergs' Norsk Hydro co-owned the aluminium factory in Heröya, Norway, with IG Farben and the German state. The German state ownership of the aluminium plant came in part from shares stolen from French Jews. In 1943, at least a quarter of the workforce at the factory were forced laborers from the Soviet Union, Norway and Poland. At the same time, there were several Swedish technicians on site in the factory.

Norsk Hydro's hydrogen electrolysis plant in Telemark, Norway, which produced heavy water as a byproduct, was attacked by the first British airborne forces in 1942 known as Operation Freshman, depicted in the film starring Kirk Douglas, the Heroes of Telemark.
Wallenberg-owned Stockholms Superfosfat Fabriks AB (today AkzoNobel), shortened Fosfatbolaget, delivered heavy water from their plant in Ljungaverk, Sweden, to the Nazi-Germany nuclear weapons program and the Manhattan project.

Bosch and IG Farben affair ― the Art of Cloaking 

Stockholms Enskilda Bank functioned as a purchasing agent for the Bosch corporation, a company that was one of the largest suppliers to Hitler. In its facility outside Berlin, it relied on prisoners of war and concentration camp prisoners as workforce. Beginning in 1939, Stockholms Enskilda Bank had bought eight Bosch companies in neutral countries and a majority of the shares in the American Bosch company, American Bosch Corporation, ABC. The business settlement was such that the parent company was awarded the right to designate buyers if the companies were to be resold. In return, Bosch had promised to help Stockholms Enskilda Bank with the German government securities worth 15 million, the Kreuger bonds, which remained after the Kreuger crash. In addition to this, Bosch gave a premium of 2.7 million to Stockholms Enskilda Bank. The acquisition of ABC was by far the largest deal and the purchase price was the equivalent of 12.4 million. In practice, the Bosch Group gained full control of the subsidiary through the business settlement.

World War II Epilogue - Safehaven Negotiations 
After the war, the US authorities subjected the bank to a blockade that was only lifted in 1947 after the Safehaven-negotiations in Washington, DC, at which the Wallenbergs were defended by friends of the family, John Foster Dulles and Allen Dulles.

Post-war Period ― the Epoch of Marcus Wallenberg Jr. - the King of Industry 

During the 1950s, Marcus Wallenberg Jr. gradually advanced his positions in industry at the expense of his brother Jacob, becoming the King of Industry, the most active person in industrial projects of the 20th century, and the man who laid the foundation for the Swedish industrial miracle. He was involved in everything from civil aviation, military aviation, nuclear power, telecommunication, computer industry, appliances, mining, forestry, banking sector, steel industry, bearing, cars and trucks. In a speech held in Falun in 1954, in which he laid out his visions, he spoke of supersonic planes, expressways, huge parking areas on the outskirts of cities, transistors on metal plates, which would enable "pocket phones", three-dimensional color television, fully automatic factories, mathematics machines, atomic power, radiation sterilisation of fresh produce, synthetic materials and medicines.

In the late 50s, Marcus Wallenberg Jr. was active on sixty company boards.

Late 20th century — 4th generation Wallenbergs 
The two sons of Marcus Wallenberg Jr., Marc and Peter, joined the Wallenberg sphere in 1953. The mother of the two, as well as their sister, Ann-Mari, was the Scotswoman, Dorothy Mackay, daughter of the Dundee-based businessman Alexander Mackay of Glencruitten (1856-1937), chairman and director of, among other companies, the Matador Land and Cattle Company, Shell Oil Corporation, The Anglo-Egyptian Oil Company, Toreador Royalties, Mackay Estates, and his wife Edith Helen Burns. The marriage ended after four years, and as a consequence, the sons were brought up by their father in Sweden, whereas their sister Ann-Mari, was brought up in United Kingdom by her mother. Dorothy later remarried the London banker and intelligence officer Charles Jocelyn Hambro.

In his younger years, Peter Wallenberg often referred to his father as cruel, but later changed to very demanding. He was reminded daily of how inept he was by his father, and later in life, either ignored or ridiculed by him in front of other CEOs in the sphere. The favourite son Marc received the same strict upbringing: any sign of weakness would be suppressed. The father Marcus Wallenberg Jr. used to box the ears of Marc in front of others. The two brothers spent several summers as guests at families such as the Morgans and Rockefellers, friends of their father, uncle and grandfather. David Rockefeller was a teenage friend of Marc Wallenberg.

Marc Wallenberg 
Marc Wallenberg studied at Harvard Business School and practiced in Geneva, at Crédit Lyonnais and Paribas in Paris, Hambros in London and in New York, at Morgan Stanley, National City (Citibank) and Brown Brothers Harriman & Co.. In 1955, Marc married Olga Wethje of the Scanian Wehtje family, founders of Skanska, daughter of director of Atlas Copco Walter Wehtje and his wife Gurli Bergström, the daughter of Paul Urbanus Bergström, founder of Pub department store. Marc Wallenberg became a deputy CEO at Stockholms Enskilda Bank the same year, and upon his uncle's, Jacob Wallenberg, resignation, a CEO in 1958. The resignation by Jacob Wallenberg opened a seat on the bank's board of directors to Peter Wallenberg Sr., younger son of Marcus Wallenberg Jr., who, against his father's will, turned down the offer, instead entering the industry and the Wallenbergs' Atlas Copco, spending significant time abroad in South Africa, US and UK.

Merger and Suicide
In 1971, Marcus Wallenberg Jr. pushed for a merger between Stockholms Enskilda Bank and rival Skandinaviska Banken Marcus Wallenberg Jr., against the will of his brother Jacob. Marcus Wallenberg Jr won the rivalry and it fell on the son Marcus "Boy-Boy" Wallenberg to execute the merger. Previously, he had tried to persuade his uncle, Jacob Wallenberg, to support the plan. The 47-year-old vice chairman of the family bank, a hard worker who served on some 60 boards, was expected to become vice-president of the merged S-E Banken. Before the merger was completed, however, Marcus's body was found in a snow-covered forest near lake Orlången in the south of Stockholm with a bullet through his head. He had committed suicide by shooting himself with his hunting rifle. Observers suggested that the act came possibly due to the fact that Marc Wallenberg felt little enthusiasm for the merger and having been under much pressure from his stern father on the one side, and his uncle, Jacob Wallenberg and Lars-Erik Thunholm on the other. Others speculated, including his father, that the prolonged cold and medication with sulfa drugs might have been fatal and resulted in his gun inflicted suicide. The merger went through in 1972.

The Epoch of Peter Wallenberg Sr. 
After the death of Marcus Wallenberg Jr. in 1982, Peter Wallenberg Sr. took over the management. For many outsiders, the change in leadership marked a final moment in the family's more than 100-year dominance of the Swedish banking and industrial sectors. Yet Peter Wallenberg Sr. rose to the challenge, guiding Investor and Sweden's industry into a new era. Peter Wallenberg Sr. focused his interests on the family's investment companies, Investor and Providentia. Investor became the family's new flagship business, and under Peter Wallenberg's leadership began actively promoting the restructuring of most of the industrial companies under its control, replacing board members and promoting younger CEOs and other management. Under Peter's leadership in the 1980s and 90s, Wallenbergs ASEA merged with Swiss Brown Boveri into ABB, Wallenbergs' Astra merged with British Zeneca into AstraZeneca, Wallenbergs' STORA merged with Finnish Enso into Stora Enso.

Already in 1970s, Peter Wallenberg established contact with top of the Chinese Communist Party. Peter was a close friend of Jiang Zemin, who visited Sweden. Peter had also close contact with Hu Jintao who, like Zemin, visited Sweden. Peter hosted a dinner for Hu Jintao.

When Henry Kissinger started his consulting firm, Kissinger and Associates, on Park Avenue in New York, the Wallenbergs were his key clients. For a fixed fee of $200,000 per year, Kissinger took upon himself, or with the help of one of his employees, to go through the situation in the world together with company management, and for a fee of $100,000 a month, the firm was also available for special projects. In the 1980s, Kissinger helped the Wallenbergs to export high technological equipment illegally to Eastern Europe.

In 1983, a delegation consisting of Peter Wallenberg Sr. and the Wallenberg CEOs Curt Nicolin of ASEA (ABB) and Hans Werthén of Electrolux, met with Minister of Finance Donald Regan on the issue of world trade, restrictions on steel, etc. It was reported that the Minister of Finance was optimistic. The Americans raised the issue of the difficulty for foreign banks to establish themselves in Sweden. The restrictions annoyed the Americans.

In September 1987, Prime Minister Ingvar Carlsson officially visited President Ronald
Reagan. The visit began with a welcome ceremony and ended with festive dinner in the White House. Ingvar Carlsson had avoided to include industrial directors in his official delegation which instead consisted of one opera singer, Birgitta Svendén, a Nobel laureate, Bengt Samuelsson, and tennis player Björn Borg. But guests at the dinner in the White House were both Peter Wallenberg Sr. and P.G. Gyllenhammar. Ingvar Carlsson said much later that he did not know how they had got on the guest list.

In 1993, George Bush Sr. was on an unofficial visit to Sweden to meet Peter Wallenberg at his Brevik estate at Värmdö in Stockholm.

Peter Wallenberg Sr. stepped down from leadership of Investor in 1997.

In 1998, it was reported in media that, George Soros was on a secretive visit to Stockholm and the Wallenberg-owned Stockholm School of Economics to meet representatives of the Wallenberg family. Soros' Quantum Group of Funds had give-up accounts at Skandinaviska Enskilda Banken. The Wallenbergs were the main backers of George Soros' Quantum Group of Funds.

In October 1999, Alibaba received millions of investment from Swedish Wallenberg family's Investor AB. In 1999, Wallenbergs Investor AB owned 6% of the shares. Joseph Tsai, co-founder and chairman of Alibaba Group, worked for the Wallenbergs at Investor AB. The Wallenberg CEO, Börje Ekholm sits on the board of Alibaba Group.

The Wallenberg-owned ABB supplied North Korea with two nuclear power plants in the early 2000s. Weapons experts warned that the waste material from the two reactors could be used for so-called "dirty bombs". Donald Rumsfeld was on the ABB board when the deal was won in 2000.

Early 21st century — 5th generation Wallenbergs 

In 2006, the fifth generation took over the Wallenberg sphere. Marcus Wallenberg, son of Marc Wallenberg, Jacob Wallenberg and Peter Wallenberg Jr. sons of Peter Wallenberg Sr.

In May 2006, Wallenbergs' bank SEB arranged a meeting in Stockholm together with World Economic Forum where experts and policymakers discussed the financial instabilities and the reformation of IMF and World Bank. The hosts were President Marcus Wallenberg and CEO Annika Falkengren.

In August, 2013, people from companies such as Academedia, EQT and Aleris in the Wallenberg sphere, and the top eschelon of the Swedish Trade Union Confederation had a secret meeting at Kommunal's course center in Marholmen to reach an agreement regarding profits in welfare.

In 2016, Jacob Wallenberg was one of the guests at the Nordic state dinner at the White House.

In March 2018, Jacob Wallenberg and Marcus Wallenberg, along with Swedish Prime Minister Stefan Löfven, Mikael Damberg, and CEOs of the Wallenberg sphere, Börje Ekholm of Ericsson, Håkan Buskhe of SAAB, Pascal Soriot of Astra Zeneca visited President Donald Trump in the White House. Afterwards Marcus Wallenberg described Trump as being "very inquisitive and curious". Wallenberg commented, "Trump mostly asked us questions about how we looked at doing business in the US and how we looked at the future."

In 2018, Knut and Alice Wallenberg Foundation decided to grant Wallenberg Centre for Quantum Technology, WACQT, at Chalmers University in Gothenburg, SEK 1.2bn to develop a quantum computer.

In 2018, Wallenbergs announced that, they will invest in Symposium, the company behind the annual Brilliant Minds Conference in Stockholm, founded by the founder of Spotify, Daniel Ek, and manager of Avicii, Ash Pournouri, with the intention to build a creative Davos. Marcus Wallenberg commented that, "Daniel Ek wants to put Sweden on the map in this new world and in the new economy. This is not about a family or an entrepreneur - it's about Sweden." In June, 2019, the Wallenbergs hosted a party at their Villa Täcka Udden, Stockholm, in connection to the annual Brilliant Minds Conference. The conference was hosted by the Wallenbergs at their Grand Hotel Stockholm. One of the guests at the after party at Villa Täcka Udden was former President Barack Obama.

In 2021, the Berzelius supercomputer for artificial intelligence, developed by Linköping University with donations of SEK 300 million from Knut and Alice Wallenberg Foundation, was installed. The researchers who will primarily work with the supercomputer are associated with the research programmes funded by the Knut and Alice Wallenberg Foundation, such as the Wallenberg AI Autonomous Systems and Software Program, WASP.

In late February 2022, it was reported in the media that, Ericsson had bribed the terror organisation ISIL in Iraq.

In late March, 2022, it became known that technology and equipment from Wallenberg-owned Atlas Copco and SKF had been sold to twelve of the Russian state's nuclear weapons manufacturers.

In April, 2022, Jacob Wallenberg participated in a secret meeting in Helsinki, Finland, with Swedish Minister of Finance Mikael Damberg and the President of Finland, Sauli Niinistö and high military officers, on the issue of NATO membership.

In September, 2022, Ericsson continued to export telecommunication equipment to Russia after the sanctions, which, according to some sources, could be used for military as well as civilian purposes.

In October, 2022, Jacob Wallenberg, CEOs from the Wallenberg sphere, and the Swedish and Dutch royal families, met at Wallenbergs Grand Hotel Stockholm to discuss the sale of submarine A26 by Saab Group to Netherlands.

Media reported in November, 2022, that, the Wallenberg family played a central role when Prime Minister Ulf Kristersson visited Turkish President Erdogan. CEOs of the Wallenberg sphere, in total CEOs of 6 multinationals in the Wallenberg sphere, were part of the delegation to Turkey, including Håkan Buskhe of Saab Group.

Wallenberg Foundations

The Wallenberg Foundations is the collective name for the private and public foundations formed by the Wallenberg family, which are the owners of Investor AB (50% voting) and fund research in technology, medicine, natural sciences, social sciences and culture. The financial and administrative matters of the 16 foundations and Wallenberg Investment AB are managed by Wallenberg Foundations AB. Wallenberg Foundations wholly control Wallenberg Investment AB, which in turn wholly controls Foundation Asset Management, Navigare. The largest are,

Knut and Alice Wallenberg Foundation (promotes scientific research within the natural sciences, technology and medicine)
Marianne and Marcus Wallenberg Foundation (focuses on research in Social Sciences)
Marcus and Amalia Wallenberg Foundation (focuses on humanities)
Jacob Wallenberg Foundation (focuses on the arts, culture and sports)
Dr.Tech. Marcus Wallenberg Foundation (focuses on international industrial studies)
Foundation for Jurisprudential Research
Berit Wallenberg Foundation (focuses on archeology and art history)
Marcus Wallenberg Foundation for International Scientific Collaboration (focuses on multi-discipline symposia)
Peter Wallenberg Foundation (focuses on economics and technology)
The Foundation for Economic History Research within Banking and Enterprise
Econ. Dr Peter Wallenberg Foundation for Entrepreneurship
Tech. Dr Marcus Wallenberg Foundation

Business 

The Wallenbergs have a very low-key public profile, eschewing conspicuous displays of wealth. The family motto is Esse, non Videri (Latin for "To be, not to be seen"). Marcus Wallenberg Sr. adopted this motto when he became a Knight and Commander of the Royal Order of the Seraphim  in 1931.

The Wallenberg business empire is often referred to as the Wallenberg sphere, the Wallenberg sphere is a large group of companies in which their investment conglomerate, Investor AB, or Foundation Asset Management (FAM), have the controlling interest. In 1916, new legislation made it more difficult for banks to own shares in industrial companies on a long-term basis. Investor was therefore formed as an investment part of Stockholms Enskilda Bank. The Wallenbergs mechanism of exercising control and power lies in the system of differential voting rights where the Wallenbergs own the strong A-shares, the voting shares.

Investor AB
As of 2023, the Wallenbergs' investment conglomerate Investor AB is the largest institutional holder (with the exception of AstraZeneca), and typically have the controlling interest, of the multinationals 

Atlas Copco (22.3% voting) — world-leading provider of compressors, vacuum solutions and air treatment systems, construction equipment, power tools and assembly systems.
ABB (13.5% voting) — world-leading supplier of  electrification and automation.
AstraZeneca (3.3% voting) — Europe's 3rd-largest pharmaceutical company.
Skandinaviska Enskilda Banken (21% voting)
Epiroc (22.7% voting) — leading productivity partner for the mining, infrastructure and natural resources industries.
Ericsson (23.8% voting) — world-leading provider of Information and Communication Technology
Nasdaq, Inc. (11.8% voting) — largest stock-exchange company worldwide
Swedish Orphan Biovitrum (34.7% voting) 
Husqvarna Group (33.4% voting) — world's largest manufacturer of outdoor solutions.
Saab Group (39.7% voting) — 6th-largest aerospace and defense company in Europe, supplier of aerospace, submarines, computer systems, missile systems, helicopters, weapon systems. 
Electrolux (30.4% voting) — second-largest appliance maker worldwide
Wärtsilä (17.7% voting)  — global leader in innovative technologies and lifecycle solutions for the marine and energy markets
Electrolux Professional (32.4% voting)
EQT Partners (14.7% voting) 
— third largest private equity firm worldwide

Patricia Industries 
Additionally, Investor AB, has controlling interest of Patricia Industries (99% voting), which has controlling interest of

Mölnlycke Health Care (99% voting)
Laborie (98% voting) 
Permobil
Sarnova (98% voting)
Piab (96% voting)
Advanced Instruments (98% voting)
BraunAbility (93% voting)
AtlasAntibodies (93% voting)
Vectura (99% voting)
3 (company) (40% voting).

EQT Partners 
Investor AB is the largest institutional holder of Europe's second-largest equity firm, third-largest in the world, EQT Partners, founded by the Wallenbergs. EQT manages a number of funds that invest in, among other things, medical technology, IT, financial companies, service companies, education, infrastructure and real estate. The funds EQT manages are EQT Infrastructure II, EQT Infrastructure III, EQT Infrastructure IV, EQT Infrastructure V, EQT IX, EQT Mid Market, EQT Mid Market Asia III, EQT Mid Market Europe, EQT Mid Market US, EQT Real Estate I, EQT Real Estate II, EQT Ventures, EQT Ventures II, EQT Ventures III, EQT VI, EQT VII and EQT VII. Furthermore, they also manage LSP 7, LSP Dementia, LSP HEF 2, The Baring Asia Private Equity Fund II, The Baring Asia Private Equity Fund III, The Baring Asia Private Equity Fund IV, The Baring Asia Private Equity Fund V, The Baring Asia Private Equity Fund VI, The Baring Asia Private Equity Fund VII and The Baring Asia Private Equity Fund VIII.

As of October 2022, EQT Partners has majority and minority ownership of 

3Shape 
Acumatica
Acuon Capital
Aelin Therapeutics
AGS Health
AIG Hospitals
Allee Center
AM-PHarma
Amolyt Pharma
Anticimex
Ardoq
Artios Pharma
Artwall
Arvelle Therapeutics
Atlantic Therapeutics
Atricom and Le Buro
AviadoBio
Azelis
Banking Circle
BBS Automation
Beijer Ref
Binx Health
Bluestep Bank
Bushu Pharmaceuticals
Campus
Cardiac dimensions
Cardior
Cast & Crew
Cerba Healthcare
Certara
CFC
China Shine
CitiusTech
Clarivate Analytics
CMS info Systems
Codemao
Coforge
Colisee
Concept
Covanta
Cue
CYE
Cypress Creek
Dataflow
Deliner Couplers
DELTA Fiber
Deutsche Glasfaser
DNA Script
DOTS Technology
Dunlop
EC-Council
EdgeConneX
Egle Therapeutics
Ellab
Eloxx Pharma
Endotronix
Envirotainer
Epidemic Sound
eTheRNA
Eton
Eureka
evidia
Evommune
Eyesense
Fiberklaar
First Student and First Transit
FoRx Therapeutics
Freepik
Golderma
Ginko
GlobalConnect
GPA Globa
Guardian Shanghai Hygiene Serice Ltd.
HMI Group
Horizon Robotics
HotSpot Therapeutics
Hutchmed
Icon Group
Idealista
IFS
IGT Solutions
ILA Vietnam
Illuminoss
ImCheck
Imcyse
Immunic
Impro Precision
Indesso
Innovative Molecules
InstaVolt
iStar Medical
IVC Evidensia
Jakarta Eye Center
JD Health
Karo Pharma
kfzteile24
Kodias Gas Services
LLC
Kuoni Group / VFS Global
Kuros
Kyobo Life Insurance
Levande
Lima
Long-Spring Education Group
Lumenis
Lumeon
Magnit
Mambu
ManyPets
Medeye
Melita
Merus
Metlifecare
MHC Asia
Minerva
Mollie
Molslinjen
Muna Therapeutics
Nest
Neurent Medical
New Amsterdam Pharma
Nexon Asia Pacific
Nkarta
Nobi
Nord Anglia
Nouscom
02 Power
One Projects
ONWARD
Open Systems
Orphazyme
Osmose Utilities Services
Inc.
Ottobock
OxThera
Parcel2GO
Parexel
Parques Reunidos
Perfuze
Pharvaris
Pioneer Corporation
Prometric
RBL Bank
Recipharm
Recover
Rich Healthcare
RIMES Technologies
Sagility
SAI360
Saturn
SAUR
Schulke
SEGRA
Sequana Medical
Shengmu Organic Milk
Shinhan Financial Group
SHL Medical
Sitecore
Smart Parc
SNPR Biome
Solarpack
Solera
Southside
SPT Labtech
Stendörren
Storable
Straive
SUSE
Svenska Verksamhetsfastigheter
T-Knife
TBS Energi (fka Toba Bara)
TELUS International
The CrownX
thinkproject
Torghatten
Tricor
TRYT
UNnum
UTA
VarmX
VBill
Vectura (Activaro)
Vicentr
Vico Therapeutics
Vietnam-USA Society English Centers (“VUS”)
Vinted, Virtuos
Virtusa
Vistra
Visus Therapeutics
Vivasure
Vivoryon Therapeutics
Wall Street English
WASH
Waystar
Wolt
WorkWave
World Freight Company
WS Audiology
Xeltis
Xilis
XyloCor Therapeutics
Zayo
Zealand Pharma.

The subsidiary of EQT Partners, EQT Ventures, has ownership of 

Oden Technologies
Holidu
Risk Methods
Min Doktor
Wolt
Unomaly
Hubs
Service Partner One
Watty
Hubs (formerly 3D Hubs
Peltarion
My Tomorrows
Small Giant Games
Peakon
HackerOne
Token
Codacy
Home
Call Desk
Varjo
Natural Cycles
Permutive
Tinyclues
AnyDesk
Quit Genius
Beamery
Silexica
Baffin Bay Networks
Banking Circle
BIM Object
Supplant
Siilo
Headspin
Handshake
Mental
Acerta Analytics
Wandelbots
dott
Warducks
Popcore
Cytora
Heart Aerospace
Standard Cognition
Darkstore
Beat81
Einride
Let's Do This
Frontify
Netlify
Sonantic
Reworks
Peanut
Anyfin
Willa
Traplight
Seeqc
Vectary
CodeSandbox
Griffin
Supernormal
Wonder
Luko
Curb
Cleo
Kive
Sana Labs
Instabox
Colossi Games
Treecard
Supernova
Playsome
Kitemaker
Airkit
Unmind
Oirigin.bio
Vev
Lenus eHealth
Owwn
Volt
Single.earth
Hiber
Verkor
Depict.AI
Linearity
Formo
Juni
Moralis
Timeless
Candela
Onramper
Billhop
Endgame
Voila
Nothing
Superlist
Knoetic.

Wallenberg Investments AB

The newly formed Wallenberg Investments AB manages and develops the assets of the Wallenberg Foundations and controls (100%) the unlisted holding companies Foundation Asset Management and Navigare, and is also the largest private owner of SAS Group (3.4% voting). Wallenberg Investments AB holdings also include EQT (1.9% voting), Saab Group (7.52% voting), Fonder and Campus X.

FAM
Wallenbergs FAM, Foundation Asset Management, is an unlisted holding company which is 100% controlled by Wallenberg Investments AB, and is the largest institutional holder of 

SKF (28.9% voting) — world's largest manufacturer of ball-bearing
Stora Enso (27.3%) — world's 4th-largest paper & pulp company (one of the largest private forest owners in the world, and world's oldest limited company, see Falun Mine)
Munters (28% voting) — global leader in energy-efficient air treatment and climate solutions
IPCO (formerly Sandvik Process Systems) (100% voting)
Kopparfors Skogar(100% voting) —  6th-largest owner of land in Sweden
The Grand Group (100% voting) — hotel, restaurant and properties (Grand Hotel Stockholm, Hotel Sparrow, Lydmar Hotel, Bolinderska Palace, Burmanska Palace, etc.) 
Höganäs AB (50% voting) — world's largest manufacturer of metal powders for powder metallurgy
Nefab (50% voting)
Kivra (41.5%) digital mailbox in Sweden

and minority ownership of 

Alfven & Didrikson
AMEXCI
Cinder Invest
Combient
GreenIron
Gropyrus
H2 Green Steel
Nanosys 
Moving Floor
Seeqc
82an Invest.

Navigare Ventures
Navigare Ventures is wholly controlled by the Wallenberg Investment AB. Navigare focuses on investments in transformational early-stage companies at the frontier of science and technology. As of 2023, the portfolio consists of 

Elypta
ScandiBio Therapeutics
Peafowl Plasmonics
Arevo
Pixelgen
Enginzyme, 
Repli5
N-ink
Ligna Energy
RiACT
Amylonix
Rarity Bioscience
AlixLabs.

Former Holdings

Scania AB
Gambro
Alfa Laval
Swedish Match
Saab Automobile
Datasaab
Stansaab
ESAB

Excerpt of former and current employees of the Wallenberg sphere

 Percy Barnevik, CEO of ASEA and ABB
 Peter Sutherland director of Investor AB
 Josef Ackermann, director of Investor AB (Deutsche Bank)
 Joseph Tsai, Investor AB (founder of Alibaba)
 Lord Erik Belfrage
 Curt Nicolin, director of STAL, chairman of ASEA and ABB
 Donald Rumsfeld, director of ABB
 Walter Wehtje
 Björn Lundvall
 Carl-Henric Svanberg 
 Börje Ekholm, CEO of Ericsson, Investor AB, 
 Lord Sven Hagströmer, Investor AB, (founder of Avanza)
 Baron Carl Bildt, Senior Advisor to the Wallenberg Foundations 
 Lord Carl Reuterskiöld "Charlie", Stockholms Enskilda Bank (founder of SWIFT)
 Lars-Erik Thunholm 
 Claes Dahlbäck 
 Adena Friedman 
 Hans Werthén
 Hans Stråberg
 Count Jacob de Geer af Leufsta director of Wallenberg investments AB (founder of Izettle)
 Count Carl de Geer af Leufsta
 Count Peder Bonde af Björnö, Stockholms Enskilda Bank, SEB, Investor (grandson of Marcus Wallenberg Sr.)
 Hans Cavalli-Björkman
 Lord Hans Munck af Rosenschiöld
 Baron Jacob Palmstierna, Stockholms Enskilda Bank, SEB (great-grandson of Andre Oscar Wallenberg)
 Olof Stenhammar, founder of OM (Nasdaq) (great-grandson of Andre Oscar Wallenberg)
 Lord Michael Treschow
 Count Tom Wachtmeister af Johannishus CEO of Atlas Copco
 Jan Stenberg
 Jan Carlzon
 Henning Throne-Holst
 Lars Ramqvist
 Hans Vestberg
 Sigfrid Edström
 Lars H. Thunell
 Annika Falkengren
 Erik Thedéen 
 Boris Hagelin, ASEA(ABB) (founder of Crypto AG)
 Grace Reksten Skaugen, board of Investor AB
 Sören Gyll
 Jan Nygren
 Stefan Stern
 Pär Nuder
 Tom Johnstone

Organisations

Bilderberg Group 
The Wallenbergs were instrumental in founding the Bilderberg Group and are members of the Steering Committee of Bilderberg Group and have invited CEOs from the Wallenberg sphere and other European companies, Scandinavian bankers, as well as editor-in-chiefs from mass media, Swedish politicians, and scientists to the meeting. The Wallenberg-owned Grand Hotel Saltsjöbaden hosted the meeting thrice, in 1962, 1973 and 1984. Marcus Wallenberg Jr. was a member of the Steering Committee and attended the meeting twenty-two times from the 1950s to 1981, a year prior to his death. His grandson Marcus Wallenberg has attended it eight times, as a member of the Steering Committee, and his other grandson, Jacob Wallenberg, seventeen times, as a member of the Steering Committee.

The Wallenbergs have invited among others Martin Waldenström, Herbert Tingsten, Per Jacobsson, Tage Erlander, Erik Boheman, Olof Palme, Björn Lundvall, Kjell Olof Feldt, Gunnar Sträng, Torbjörn Fälldin, Sten Gustafsson, Björn Svedberg, Hans Werthén, Leif Johansson (businessman), Curt Nicolin, Carl Bildt, Percy Barnevik, Michael Treschow, Erik Belfrage, Claes Dahlbäck, Anna Lindh, Leif Pagrotsky, Fredrik Reinfeldt, Anders Borg, Nils Svensson, Hugo Lindgren, Hans Stråberg, Carl-Henric Svanberg, Alexei Mordashov, Jonas Bonnier, Börje Ekholm, Björn Wahlroos, Håkan Buskhe, Mikael Damberg, Magdalena Andersson, Conni Jonsson, Johanna Rosén, Annie Lööf, Danica Kragic, Ulf Kristersson, Sara Mazur, Johan Rockström, Lena Hallengren.

Trilateral Commission 

Members of the Trilateral Commission include Marcus Wallenberg Jr., Peter Wallenberg Sr., Jacob Wallenberg and Marcus Wallenberg.

Former members of the Wallenberg sphere include former Vice President of SEB, diplomat and advisor for Investor AB and the Wallenbergs, Erik Belfrage, the Irish lawyer, former Investor AB employee, and friend of the Wallenbergs, Peter Sutherland. Current member of the Wallenberg sphere is Magnus Schöldtz. Swedish former Prime Minister Carl Bildt and Annie Lööf have been invited, the former is a standing member.

The European Meeting of the Trilateral Commission in 2019 was held at Wallenbergs' Grand Hotel.

ICC — International Chamber of Commerce 

The Wallenbergs contributed to the founding of ICC and have played a leading role in the history of the ICC. They have been honoured by the Wallenberg Room on the 6th floor of the headquarters of ICC in Paris.

Peter Wallenberg was Immediate Past President of the ICC in Paris. Marcus Wallenberg Jr. was a long serving Chairman, and his grandson Marcus Wallenberg is the longest serving Chairman in the history of ICC and is now an Honorary Chairman.Marcus Wallenberg was the founding contributor to the ICC research foundation in 2009.

The international ICC Congress in 1984 was held in Stockholm. The social program included a council dinner in the mirror hall at Wallenbergs Stockholm Grand Hotel. The closing part consisted of an air show "Swedish Technology in the air" and a gastronomic odyssey through Sweden, served in all of the banquet halls at the Grand Hotel. Keynote speaker at the opening session was Henry Ford II. At the closing session, Peter Wallenberg Sr., in his capacity as Chairman of the Drafting Committee, presented a number of conclusions, summarising the main conclusions of the Congress sessions, in particular, recommending to the Congress that a) business, government and trade unions jointly develop a "tripartite strategy" to create employment, b) the business community bring an end to its demands regarding the threatened industries, as protectionism is one of the major obstacles to productive new investment, which in turn leads to increased employment, c) the business community, governments and torch-bearing organisations invest more in education and retraining projects, which can promote the adaptation to new forms of production and conditions, d) the companies review the internal information channels and systems so that they are adapted to the needs for increased and improved information that arise in connection with extensive restructuring and adaptation plans, and e) the representatives of business become more active in public opinion formation and thus contribute to creating a better factual basis for a balanced debate.

Peter Wallenberg Sr. presided over ICCs Congress in 1990 in Hamburg, Germany.

European Round Table of Industrialists 

Jacob Wallenberg, CEO of Investor and Vice Chairman of FAM, is a member of European Round Table of Industrialists Steering Committee, representing Investor AB. Other people from the Wallenberg sphere at ERT are Börje Ekholm, CEO of Ericsson, Ulrich Spiesshofer, CEO of ABB, Leif Johansson, CEO of Astra Zeneca, CEO of ABB Björn Rosengren.

Former members from the Wallenberg sphere include Curt Nicolin, CEO of ASEA (ABB), Carl-Henric Svanberg (Ericsson, Volvo and BP), and Pehr G. Gyllenhammar (Volvo), the founder of European Round Table of Industrialists in 1983.

Institute of International Finance 
Marcus Wallenberg is Vice-Chairman and Treasurer of the Institute of International Finance.

World Economic Forum 

Jacob Wallenberg was Vice-Chairman of World Economic Forum and his cousin, Marcus Wallenberg, has been a participant. In May 2006, Wallenbergs' bank SEB arranged a meeting in Stockholm together with World Economic Forum at which experts and policymakers discussed the financial instabilities and the reformation of IMF and World Bank. The hosts were President Marcus Wallenberg and CEO Annika Falkengren.

ECGI - European Corporate Governance Institute 

The Wallenbergs' Investor AB sponsors ECGI.

Atlantic Council 

Jacob Wallenberg is a member of the International Advisory Board.

Properties (excerpt)

Institutions, Centers and other Foundations (excerpt) 

Wallenberg Wood Science Center, KTH Royal Institute of Technology, Chalmers University of Technology and Linköping University
Raoul Wallenberg Institute of Human Rights and Humanitarian Law
Stockholm School of Economics
Stockholm School of Economics in Riga
Stockholm School of Economics in St. Petersburg
Wallenberg Center for Molecular Medicine
Wallenberg Center for Quantum Technology at Chalmers University
Wallenberg Center for Neuroscience at Lund University
Wallenberg AI, Autonomous Systems and Software Program
Wallenberg Initiative Materials Science for Sustainability, WISE
The Scania Museum Marcus Wallenberg Hall in Södertälje
The Jacob and Marcus Wallenberg Center for Innovative and Sustainable Business Development
The Wallenberg Conference Center
The Wallenberg Center for Financial Research (WCEFIR) at Hanken School of Economics, Helsinki 
Wallenberg Centre for Protein Research (WCPR) at the AlbaNova University Center at KTH Royal Institute of Technology, SciLifeLab in Stockholm, Uppsala University, and Chalmers University of Technology in Gothenburg.
The Wallenberg Laboratory at Gothenburg University
The Wallenberg Laboratory at Karolinska Institute
Wallenberg laboratory animal facility
The Wallenberg Hall at Stanford University
Nobel Hall Wallenberg Auditorium at Gustavus Adolphus College

Real Estate & Residence (excerpt)

Quotes

Quotes on the Wallenbergs

Quotes by the Wallenbergs

Ancestry

Notable family members 

 Marcus Wallenberg (1744–1799), priest, lector of theology
 Marcus Wallenberg (1774–1833), nephew of Jacob Wallenberg, bishop in Linköping.
 André Oscar Wallenberg (1816–1886), son of Marcus Wallenberg, naval officer, newspaper tycoon, banker and politician.
 Oscara Wilhelmina Wallenberg (1847-1864)
 Jacob Axel Wallenberg (1851-)
 Knut Agathon Wallenberg (1853–1938), son of André Oscar Wallenberg, banker and politician, married the Norwegian Alice Olga Constance Nickelsen
 Anders Wilhelm Wallenberg (1855-)
 Anna Oscara Wallenberg (1865-) married to chamberlain Johan Edvard Gustaf Bergenstråhle
 Siri Eleonora Carolina Wallenberg (1868-) married to colonel and military attache, count Erik Carl Oxenstierna af Korsholm och Wasa
 Ingeborg Emma Gustafva Wallenberg (1870-) married to Jacob Fredrik Wallenberg
 Jacob Oscar Wallenberg (1872-)
 Lilly Wilhelmina Wallenberg (1873-) married to major Carl Gustaf Achates Crafoord
 Axel Fingal Wallenberg (1874-)
 Victor Henry Wallenberg (1875-)
 Alfhild Laura Wallenberg (1877-) married to baron Gustaf Oscar Magnus af Ugglas
 Maria Oscara (1878-1880)
 Ruuth Ingrid Wallenberg (1880-) married to baron Carl Magnus von Essen
 Gustaf Wallenberg (1863–1937), son of André Oscar Wallenberg, diplomat.
 Raoul Oscar Wallenberg (1888–1912), son of Gustaf Wallenberg, naval officer.
 Raoul Wallenberg (1912–), son of Raoul Oscar Wallenberg, diplomat.
 Marcus Wallenberg Sr. ("Häradshövdingen") (1864–1943), son of André Oscar Wallenberg, banker, industrialist and politician.
 Sonja Emilie Wallenberg (1891–1970), daughter of Marcus Wallenberg Sr. and Amalia Wallenberg (née Hagdahl), married to count Carl Johan Magnus Johan Björnstjerna.
 Baroness Ulla Anna Charlotta Björnstjerna (1916-)
 Baroness Elizabeth Helena Amalia Charlotta Björnstjerna (1917–2010)
 Baroness Sonja Monica Charlotta Björnstjerna (1920–1955)
 Baroness Sonja Ingeborg Charlotta Björnstjerna
 Jacob Wallenberg ("Juju") (1892–1980), son of Marcus Wallenberg Sr., naval officer, banker, industrialist.
 Peder Wallenberg (1935–), son of Jacob Wallenberg, architect, businessman.
 Fredrik Wallenberg
 Marie Wallenberg
 Peder Wallenberg
 Nicholas Wallenberg
 Anna Wallenberg
 Peder Wallenberg Jr.
 Christopher Wallenberg
 Alexander Wallenberg
 Andrea Wallenberg (1894–1980), daughter of Marcus Wallenberg Sr. and Amalia Wallenberg (née Hagdahl), married to count Hakon Mörner af Morlanda
 Countess Gunilla Bonde Mörner af Morlanda ("Grotte") (1919–1994)
 Countess Caroline Mörner af Morlanda ("Gyllenkrok") (1922–2004)
 Gertrud Wallenberg (1895–1983), daughter of Marcus Wallenberg Sr. and Amalia Wallenberg (née Hagdahl), married to count Ferdinand Maria Emmerich Eduard Arco auf Valley, and partner of statesman and baron Carl Gustaf Emil Mannerheim
 Ebba Wallenberg (1896–1960), daughter of Marcus Wallenberg Sr. and Amalia Wallenberg (née Hagdahl), married to count Carl Gustaf Bonde af Björnö(1872–1957)
 Count Peder Carlsson Bonde af Björnö (1923–2013) Deputy CEO of SEB, CEO of Banque Scandinave en Suisse in Geneva, vice chairman of Investor, chairman of the Marcus and Amalia Wallenberg Foundation, board member of the International Management and Development Institute in Washington, member of the advisory board at the World Economic Forum in Geneva.
 Marcus Wallenberg Jr. ("Dodde") (1899–1982), son of Marcus Wallenberg Sr., banker and industrialist.
 Marc Wallenberg ("Boy-Boy") (1924–1971), son of Marcus Wallenberg Jr., banker.
 Marcus Wallenberg ("Husky") (1956–), son of Marc Wallenberg, banker and industrialist.
 Marc Wallenberg (born 1986)
 Elsa Wallenberg
 Fred Wallenberg
 Lukas Wallenberg
 Axel Wallenberg ("Vava") (1958–2011), son of Marc Wallenberg, businessman.
 Martina Wallenberg
 Peter Wallenberg Sr. ("Pirre") (1926–2015), son of Marcus Wallenberg Jr., banker and industrialist.
 Jacob Wallenberg (1956–), son of Peter Wallenberg Sr., banker and industrialist.
 Lovisa Wallenberg Cavalli (born 1988)
 Jacob Wallenberg Jr. (born 1992)
 Alice Wallenberg (born 1989)
 Andrea Wallenberg
 Peter Wallenberg Jr. ("Poker") (1959–), son of Peter Wallenberg Sr., businessman and racing driver.
 Jacob Oscar Wallenberg (1872–1939), son of André Oscar Wallenberg, naval officer and director of Swedish Tobacco AB, Tobaksbolaget.
 Carol Wallenberg (1904-1985), son of Jacob Oscar Wallenberg, director of Swedish East Asiatic Company.
 Axel Wallenberg (1874–1963), son of André Oscar Wallenberg, industrialist and diplomat.
 Gustaf Wally (1905–1966), son of Axel Wallenberg, dancer, actor and theatre manager.
 Victor Wallenberg (1875–1970), son of André Oscar Wallenberg, sports shooter.
 Victor Axel Henry Wallenberg (1908–1993), son of Victor Wallenberg, consul general in Monaco.
 Jan Henry Sten Wallenberg (1933-2009), son of Henry Wallenberg.
 Jacob Wallenberg (1746–1778), sailor, clergyman and author.

References

External links 

Wallenberg Family Tree on Kindo
Investor AB and Wallenberg family history

 
 
Banking families
Raoul Wallenberg
Swedish businesspeople
Swedish families